Tetrazene is a chemical compound with the molecular formula H2NN=NNH2. It is a colorless explosive material.  An analogue is the organosilicon derivative (tms)2NN=NN(tms)2 where tms is trimethylsilyl. Isomeric with tetrazine is ammonium azide.

Tetrazene explosive, commonly known simply as tetrazene, is used for sensitization of priming compositions.

Properties
Tetrazene has eleven isomers. The most stable of these is the straight-chain 2-tetrazene (H2-NN=N-NH2), having a standard heat of formation at 301.3 kJ/mol. The eleven isomers can be arranged into three groups: straight-chain tetrazenes, four-membered cyclotetrazane, and three-membered cyclotriazanes. Each straight-chain tetrazene isomer possesses one N=N double bond and two N-N single bonds. Tautomerizations do occur between the isomers.  The ionic compound ammonium azide is also a constitutional isomer of tetrazene.

Organometallic derivatives
A variety of coordination complexes are known for R2N42- (R = methyl, benzyl).

References

Nitrogen hydrides